Lucilla Galeazzi  (Terni, 24 December 1950) is an Italian folk singer.  She performs modern versions of traditional Italian folk music.  She has also performed in operas.

Discography 

1977 Correvano coi carri (with Giovanna Marini)
1977 La grande madre impazzita (with Giovanna Marini)
1980 Cantate pour tous les jours 1 e 2 (with Giovanna Marini)
1984 Pour Pier Paolo Pasolini (with Giovanna Marini)
1986 Anninnia (with Paolo Damiani)
1986 Il paese con le ali (with Ambrogio Sparagna)
1987 Per Devozione (Lucilla Galeazzi and Giancarlo Schiaffini)
1990 Cantata profana (with Giovanna Marini)
1992 Il Trillo (L. Galeazzi, Ambrogio Sparagna, Carlo Rizzo)
1993 Giofà il servo del re (with Ambrogio Sparagna)
1995 Invito (with Ambrogio Sparagna)
1995 Rock’s Airs de la lune (L. Galeazzi and Claude Barthélemy Trio)
1996 Mammas (with Philippe Eidel)
1997 Cuore di terra (Lucila Galeazzi)
1997 La Banda (with Michel Godard)
1997 La via dei Romei (with Ambrogio Sparagna)
1998 Honig und Asche (with Michael Riessler)
1999 Ali d’oro (with Michel Godard)
2000 Castel del Monte (with Michel Godard, Linda Bsiri, Pino Minafra, Gianluigi Trovesi, Jean-Louis Matinier, Renaud Garcia-Fons & Pierre Favre)
2001 Lunario (Lucilla Galeazzi)
2002 La Tarantella (with Christina Pluhar / L'Arpeggiata)
2002 Renaissance (with Philippe Eidel)
2004 All’improvviso (with Christina Pluhar / L'Arpeggiata)
2004 Trio Rouge (Lucilla Galeazzi, Michel Godard, Vincent Courtois)
2005 Stagioni (Lucilla Galeazzi)
2006 Amore e Acciaio Lucilla Galeazzi (with M. Nardi, M. Gatti, Fisorchestra Fancelli, S. Zambataro, A. Ramous, M.Carrano)
2010 Sopra i tetti di Firenze (with Riccardo Tesi e Maurizio Geri)
2010 Ancora Bella Ciao Lucilla Galeazzi (with D. Polizzotto and S. Scatozza)
2011 La Tarantella / Antidotum Tarantulae (with L'Arpeggiata, Christina Pluhar and Marco Beasley)
2012 Il Natale dei Semplici (with N. Citarella, C. Bava ciaramella, G. Galfetti, C. Califano, Nora Tigges)
2013 Festa Italiana (with N. Citarella, M.Ambrosini, K.Seddiki, C.Califano, C.Rizzo, F.Turrisi, L.Teruggi, S.Napoli, A.Sparagna, A. D'Alessandro)
2015 Sirena dei Mantici (with Ascanio Celestini, Lucilla Galeazzi, Fisorchestra Fancelli, M. Gatti)
2015 Bella Ciao (with Riccardo Tesi, Andrea Salvadori, Gigi Biolcati, Elena Ledda, Ginevra Di Marco, Alessio Lega)

References

External links 
Official website of Lucilla Galeazzi

Living people
Italian folk singers
Year of birth missing (living people)